The following compact discs were sold with a software package for copy-protection known as MediaMax CD-3, created by SunnComm and used by the record label RCA Records/Arista Records/BMG.

See also
 List of compact discs sold with Extended Copy Protection
 Sony BMG copy protection rootkit scandal

References 

Compact Disc and DVD copy protection